Pella Dutch, also known as Iowa Dutch, is a dialect of the Dutch language spoken in Pella, Iowa. It is a subdialect of South Guelderish.

Pella Dutch's origins began with the migration of a group of 800 Dutch settlers under the leadership of Dominee (Reverend) H. P. Scholte in 1847.

In 1860, the Pella Weekblad, Pella's first Dutch language newspaper, debuted. The paper continued to be published weekly until 1941.

Language use was strongly affected by Governor William L. Harding's controversial 1917 Babel Proclamation, which banned the speaking of languages other than English in public.

Semi-speakers of the dialect have been attested as recently as 2011.

References

Pella, Iowa
Dutch-American culture in Iowa
Dutch dialects
Dutch language in the United States